Saint Tysilio (also known as/confused with Saint Suliac; ; died 640 AD) was a Welsh bishop, prince and scholar, son of the reigning King of Powys, Brochwel Ysgithrog, maternal nephew of the great Abbot Dunod of Bangor Iscoed and an ecclesiastic who took a prominent part in the affairs of Wales during the distressful period at the opening of the 7th century.

Life
Prince Tysilio (or Sulio) was the second son of Brochfael Ysgythrog (of the Tusks). He fled his father's court at an early age to throw himself on the mercy of Abbot Gwyddfarch of Caer-Meguaidd (Meifod) and beg to become a monk. A Powysian warband was sent to retrieve him, but King Brochfael was eventually persuaded that his son should be allowed to stay. Tysilio probably started his career in Trallwng Llywelyn (Welshpool) and afterwards took up residence in Meifod where he was associated with Gwyddvarch and St Beuno.

Fearful of further trouble from his family, Tysilio set up his base at a hermitage on Ynys Tysilio (Church Island) in the Menai Strait and became a great evangeliser on Ynys Môn (Anglesey). He spent seven years there before returning to Caer-Meguaidd (Meifod) and succeeding as Abbot. Tyslio rebuilt the Abbey Church and things were peaceful for a while. He founded the second church in Meifod - the Eglwys Tysilio. His feast day, or gwyl-mabsant, was 8 November which was also the date of the patronal festival and "wakes" in the nearby parish of Guilsfield, where a holy well was dedicated to him - the Fons Tysilio.

After the death of Tysilio's brother Cynan Garwyn, his sister-in-law, Queen Gwenwynwyn, desired to marry Tysilio and place him on the throne of Powys. Objecting to both proposals, Tysilio refused and found his monastery persecuted by the state. He resolved to leave for Brittany with a handful of followers. Tysilio travelled through Dyfed and across the Channel to Saint-Suliac where he established a second monastery. Tysilio is traditionally said to be the original author of the Brut Tysilio, a variant of the Welsh chronicle Brut y Brenhinedd, although Brynley F. Roberts has demonstrated that the Brut Tysilio originated around 1500 as an "amalgam" of earlier versions of the Brut y Brenhinedd, which itself derives from Geoffrey of Monmouth's 12th-century Latin Historia Regum Britanniae.

Tysilio died and was buried at the Abbey of Saint Suliac in 640.

Identity
St. Tysilio has been confused, historically, with Saint Sulien, with some scholars suggesting that they were the same historical character. The facts that they lived in different Celtic states, and had different feast days from antiquity, make this suggestion unlikely.

Place names

Today Tysilio's name is remembered in several church and place names in Wales, including Llandysilio in Powys, Llandissilio in Pembrokeshire, Llandysiliogogo in Ceredigion and Llantysilio in Denbighshire.

Most famously it appears in the longest place name in the United Kingdom, Llanfairpwllgwyngyllgogerychwyrndrobwllllantysiliogogogoch, part of which (shown bold here) means the Church of St. Tysilio. The name, however, is a late 19th-century invention for the burgeoning tourist industry in the area.

References 

Roberts, Brynley F. (ed.). Brut y Brenhinedd (Llanstephan MS 1), Brut y Brenhinedd. Llanstephan MS. 1 version. Selections. Mediaeval and Modern Welsh series 5. Dublin, 1971. Extracts and discussion.
Simpson Jones, T. and Owen, R. (1901), "A History of the Parish of Guilsfield (Cedigva)", Montgomery Collections; 31, 129–200.

Further reading
 

People from Powys
Welsh royalty
Medieval Welsh saints
640 deaths
Year of birth unknown